Wallis (Wallisian: Uvea) is a Polynesian atoll/island in the Pacific Ocean belonging to the French overseas collectivity (collectivité d'outre-mer, or COM) of Wallis and Futuna. It lies north of Tonga, northeast of Fiji, east-northeast of the Hoorn Islands, east of Fiji's Rotuma, southeast of Tuvalu, southwest of Tokelau and west of Samoa. Its area is almost  with 8,333 people. Its capital is Mata Utu. Roman Catholicism is the predominant religion. Its highest point is Mount Lulu Fakahega. Wallis is of volcanic origin with fertile soil and some remaining lakes. Rainfall is plentiful.

It was part of the Tongan maritime empire from around the 13th to 16th century. By that time the influence of the Tui Tonga had declined so much that Uvea became important in itself. The big fortress of Talietumu close to Lotoalahi in Mua was the last holdout of the Tongans until they were defeated. The island was renamed "Wallis" after a Cornish navigator, Captain Samuel Wallis, who saw it while sailing aboard  on 16 August 1767. On 5 April 1842, the authorities of Wallis Island requested protection by France with a protectorate treaty signed in April 1887. After a referendum in 1959, Wallis became a French Overseas Territory in 1961.

Geography 

Its highest point is Mount Lulu Fakahega, which rises . There are also a few large lakes such as Lake Lalolalo. These crater lakes attest to the island's volcanic origin. Some of the lakes, such as Lalolalo and Lanu'tavake appear as almost perfect circles with straight vertical walls.

Together with some 15 smaller islands surrounding it, on its huge barrier reef, it forms the Wallis archipelago. Wallis has a fertile volcanic soil and sufficient rainfall to allow subsistence farming.

Wallis is subdivided into three districts (north to south):

Hihifo: 5 villages: Vailala, Tufuone, Vaitupu, Malae, and Alele
Hahake: 6 villages: Liku, Aka'aka, Mata Utu, Ahoa, Falaleu, and Ha'afuasia
Mu'a: 10 villages: Lavegahau, Tepa, Gahi, Ha’atofo,  Mala’efo’ou, Kolopo, Halalo, Utufua, Vaimalau, and Teesi

 
Sub-equatorial oceanic trade winds make the island hot and humid. The average temperature is around  all year round and there is almost never drops below , and in the rainy season is held in the mark .

This rain is likely at least 260 days in a year, and the humidity is 80%. The rainy season lasts from November to April. The same period (November to March), the season of storms, is associated with the passage over the territory of the islands of powerful tropical cyclones. It is followed, in May to October–December, by a cooler and drier season because of the predominance in this period of the southeast trade winds.

Climate

Climate data of Wallis Island 

Wallis (Hihifo District) has a tropical rainforest climate (Köppen climate classification Af).

Climate crisis 
Whilst Wallis is not in danger of complete submersion due to the rising sea-levels, the majority of the population live in coastal settlements, which will be affected.

History 
Archaeological excavations have identified sites on Wallis dating from circa 1400 AD. It was part of the Tongan maritime empire from around the 13th to 16th century. By that time the influence of the Tui Tonga had declined so much that Uvea became important in itself. Several current, high-ranking Tongan titles, like Halaevalu, trace their descent from Uvea. A legendary large canoe, the Lomipeau, was built on the island as a donation to the Tui Tonga. The big fortress of Talietumu close to Lotoalahi in Mua was the last holdout of the Tongans until they were defeated. The ruins of the place are still a tourist attraction.

The island was renamed "Wallis" after a Cornish navigator, Captain Samuel Wallis, who saw it while sailing aboard  on 16 August 1767, following his discovery of Tahiti.

In 1835, Uvea was attacked by a party of armed missionaries from Tonga, who attempted to convert the island to Protestantism by force. In October 1837, Jean-Baptiste Pompallier visited, and after negotiations with Lavelua, left a priest and a brother behind, ostensibly to learn the language and establish friendly relations. Four years later they reported that Wallis was a Catholic community. On 5 April 1842, the authorities of Wallis Island requested protection by France. A protectorate treaty was signed in April 1887.

During World War II the island's administration was pro-Vichy until a Free French corvette from New Caledonia deposed the regime on 26 May 1942. Units of the US Marine Corps landed on Wallis on 29 May 1942.

After a referendum in 1959, Wallis became a French Overseas Territory in 1961.

Demographics 
The population of the island was 8,333 in 2018 (72% of the territory's population). Most of the inhabitants speak Uvean (or Wallisian) as their mother tongue.

Culture and religion 

Religion ("Lotu") and culture ("Aga'ifenua") are very close in Wallis. Everyday life is heavily influenced by Polynesian traditions and especially by the Roman Catholic feasts. Each village has its own patron saint. Each district has its great church. The chief cathedral is the Cathedral of Mata Utu. Almost all the people are Roman Catholic ("Lotu Katolika"), and there are numerous religious buildings on the island.

At their arrival, Catholic missionaries were welcomed by the King Vaimua Lavelua then baptized "Soane-Patita Vaimua". Bishop Bataillon developed close relationships with the royal families. As Private Councillor of Queen Amelia, he established in 1847 the Lano Seminary (the first Catholic seminary of Oceania).

Lano celebrated 150 years in 1997. The anniversary was attended by Samoan Cardinal Pio Taofinu'u, who studied there in the 1940s, and a big delegation from Tonga, Samoa, Fiji and New-Caledonia.

Wallis and Futuna was established as an apostolic vicariate on 11 November 1935 and promoted to a diocese on 21 June 1966.

Transportation 
The only commercial flights to Wallis are operated by the New Caledonia-based Aircalin. There is an Aircalin office in Mata Utu in Hahake.

Education
The island has 12 primary schools, four junior high schools, and one senior high school/sixth-form college.
Junior high schools (collèges) in Wallis: Mataotama de Malae, Alofivai de Lano, Vaimoana de Lavegahau, and Tinemui de Teesi
The senior high school/sixth-form college is Lycée d'Etat de Wallis et Futuna on Wallis

Museums 
Uvea Museum Association is a private museum in Mata Utu which records the history of the Second World War on the island.

Notable people
 Ilaïsaane Lauouvéa - politician in New Caledonia

See also 
 Hihifo Airport
 Samoa hotspot

References

Bibliography 
 E.G. Burrows, Ethnology of Uvea, BPB 1937.
 
, Volume I, Volume II-III

External links 

 French world linguistics site
 Map showing details of Wallis Island
 Pictures of Wallis
 Flag of `Ueva chiefdom
 Wallis Wordlist at the Austronesian Basic Vocabulary Database

Islands of Wallis and Futuna
Volcanoes of the Pacific Ocean
Island countries
Volcanic crater lakes
Former protectorates